Moradberdi (also Romanized as Morādberdī) is a village in Jafarbay-ye Sharqi Rural District, Gomishan District, Torkaman County, Golestan Province, Iran. At the 2006 census, its population was 203, in 42 families.

References 

Populated places in Torkaman County